Honoré Julien Jean-Baptiste Chouinard, CMG (June 18, 1850 – November 27, 1928) was a lawyer, railroad company executive and political figure in Quebec. He represented Dorchester in the House of Commons of Canada from 1888 to 1891 as a Nationalist Conservative member.

He was born in Quebec City, the son of Honoré-Julien Chouinard and Marie Elisabeth Célina Pelletier. Chouinard was educated at the Collège Sainte-Anne, the Séminaire de Québec and the Université Laval. He was called to the Quebec bar in 1873. In 1884, he married Marie Louise Isabelle Juchereau Duchesnay, the daughter of seigneur Elzéar-Henri Juchereau Duchesnay. He served as a member of the council for Quebec City. Chouinard was one of the founders of the newspaper La Justice. He was vice-president of the Quebec and Lac Saint-Jean Railway. Chouinard was also president of Le Club Cartier de Québec, the Quebec Geographical Society, L'Institut Canadien de Québec and La Societé Saint-Jean-Baptiste de Québec. He ran unsuccessfully in the federal riding of L'Islet in 1882. Chouinard was elected to the House of Commons in an 1888 by-election held after the death of his brother-in-law Henri-Jules Juchereau Duchesnay.

He served as clerk for the city of Quebec from 1890 to 1927. Chouinard published a number of works including Histoire de la Societé Saint-Jean-Baptiste de Québec. He was one of the first to advocate a major celebration for the tricentennial of Quebec City in 1908 and the establishment of a park on the Plains of Abraham. He was appointed Companion of the Order of St Michael and St George in 1908 as the Secretary to the National Battlefields Commission, Quebec.

He died at Quebec City at the age of 78.

References 

The Canadian parliamentary companion, 1889 AJ Gemmill

External links 
 
 Annales de la Société St-Jean-Baptiste de Québec ... Volume 1 (1903) HJJB Chouinard 
 Annales de la Société St-Jean-Baptiste de Québec ... Volume 4 (1903) HJJB Chouinard 
 Invasion du Canada et siège de Québec en 1775-76 (1876) L-P Turcotte & HJJB Chouinard 
 Troisième centenaire de la fondation de Québec, berceau du Canada ... (1908) HJJB Chouinard 
 Paul de Chomedey, sieur de Maisonneuve, fondateur de Montréal  ... (1882) HJJB Chouinard 
 Monographie d'une famille canadienne-française : les Juchereau-Duchesnay (1903) HJJB Chouinard 

1850 births
1928 deaths
Members of the House of Commons of Canada from Quebec
Nationalist Conservative MPs
Canadian Companions of the Order of St Michael and St George
Université Laval alumni